FC Khimik-Arsenal is a Russian football team from Novomoskovsk. It played professionally from 1954 to 1979, from 1993 to 2007 and again from the 2017–18 season to 2020–21. They played on the second-highest level in the Soviet First League from 1954 to 1979, where their best result was 2nd place in Zone 1 in 1970. They were a farm-club for FC Arsenal Tula. For the 2021–22 season, Arsenal registered FC Arsenal-2 Tula for the third tier as their farm club.

Team name history
 1954–1955: FC Shakhtyor Stalinogorsk (Novomoskovsk was called Stalinogorsk at the time)
 1956–1957: FC Shakhtyor Mosbass (Mosbass was a regional subdivision of Moscow Oblast that Stalinogorsk was a capital of at the time)
 1958: FC Trud Stalinogorsk
 1959–1960: FC Shakhtyor Stalinogorsk
 1961–1992: FC Khimik Novomoskovsk
 1993–2009: FC Don Novomoskovsk
 2010–2019: FC Khimik Novomoskovsk
 2019–p.d: FC Khimik-Arsenal

References

External links
  Official website

 
Association football clubs established in 1954
Football clubs in Russia
Sport in Tula Oblast
1954 establishments in Russia